The emboliform nucleus (or anterior interposed nucleus) is a deep cerebellar nucleus that lies immediately to the medial side of the nucleus dentatus, and partly covering its hilum. It is one among the four pairs of deep cerebellar nuclei, which are from lateral to medial: the dentate, interposed (which consists of the emboliform and globose), and fastigial nuclei. These nuclei can be seen using Weigert's elastic stain.

Emboliform, from Ancient Greek, means "shaped like a plug or wedge".

Structure
The emboliform nucleus is a wedge-shaped structure of gray matter found at the medial side of the hilum of the dentate nucleus. Its neurons display a similar structure from those of the dentate nucleus. In some mammals the emboliform nucleus is continuous with the globose nucleus, forming together the interposed nucleus. When present, the interposed nucleus can be divided in an anterior and a posterior interposed nucleus, considered homologues of the emboliform and globose nuclei, respectively.

Function
As a part of the interposed nucleus, the emboliform participates in the spinocerebellum, a system that regulates the precision of limb movements. Axons leaving the emboliform exit through the superior cerebellar peduncle and reach the red nucleus in the midbrain and several thalamic nuclei which project into areas of the cerebral cortex that control limb movement.

References

External links
 https://web.archive.org/web/20150621011739/http://www.mona.uwi.edu/fpas/courses/physiology/neurophysiology/Cerebellum.htm
 https://web.archive.org/web/20080405060224/http://www.lib.mcg.edu/edu/eshuphysio/program/section8/8ch6/s8ch6_30.htm
 NIF Search - Emboliform Nucleus via the Neuroscience Information Framework

Cerebellum